Luis Bezeta (Luis Bourgon Zubieta, 12 April 1976) is a visual artist and Spanish filmmaker.

He studied Physics at the University of Cantabria. Later in 2001, he traveled to Germany, where he continued studying Theoretical Physics at the FU Berlin. Then in 2006, finished the Advanced Course Direction and Production Film-Video-TV in IDEP, Barcelona.

Fascinated by the silent films of Buster Keaton and Méliès, he entered the Institute of Audiovisual Sciences in Berlin in 2001 and in 2006 performed the Course of mounting the School of Cinema and Audiovisual of Catalonia (ESCAC).

In his youth he treats various disciplines such as theater, short or animated image, but his desire to work with the moving image takes you very quickly to video art.

He is an expert in auto shooting and in performar with fictional characters played by the same.

In 2011 the Museum of Modern and Contemporary Art of Santander and Cantabria MeBas space opens and organizes its first major exhibition individual. La Capella de Barcelona Production in turn organized in 2014 a solo exhibition entitled 'Es una escena en la que yo mismo actúo'.

It has been part of numerous solo and group exhibitions both nationally and internationally. In his pieces use different visual and auditory procedures such as video, photography, drawing or performance.

He is the founder and creator of the spaces Pandemolden Laboratory of Art and Demolden Video Project.

Works
 Untitled (1999)
 Madurodam (2000)
 Imagine (2001) (emission Televisión Española)
 Suchen (2002) (emission Televisión Española)
 My mate Paul (2003)
 Muñecas (2004) (installation)
 Autorretrato cubista (2005) (installation)
 Oh my love (2006) (installation)
 Dish washer (2006) (installation)
 Ocasión (2007)
 Piolin (2008)
 La fiesta de la cereza (2009) 
 Hombre jarrón (2010) (emission Televisión Española)
 Berlin Remixed (2011) (documentary)
 Norma Jeane es Marilyn (2011) (installation)
 East west (2011)
 azul/rosa (2012)
 The factory (2013)
 Video-film (2014) (installation)
 Es una escena en la que yo mismo actúo (2014)
 La élite del poder (2014) (documentary)
 Mass media (2015)
 Studio (2015)
 Videodisco (2016)
 MKYC (2016) (film)
 Vorprofil (2017)
 Bassxpander (2018)
 El principio de la cinematicidad (2019) (film)
 Paper tiger (2020)

Exhibitions
 Postcontemporánea. Arte Contemporáneo. Grupo Cadena Media TV (Spain) (2021)
 Plataforma Audiovisual. Area de Cultura de la Diputación de Barcelona (Spain) (2020)
 Barcelona Producció. La Capella|25 Años. Barcelona (Spain) (2019)
 XX Bienal Internacional de Arte de Cerveira (Portugal) (2018)
 7mo Festival Internacional de Videoarte de Camagüey (Cuba) (2017)
 VideoBardo 20 Years International Videopoetry Festival (Argentina) (2016)
 VideoSpain, Centro Cultural España en Lima (Perú) (2015)
 Cel·AV | Vídeo a Konvent, Berguedà, Barcelona (2015)
 La Capella, BCN Producció, Barcelona (2014)
 12, Demolden Video Project, Santander (2013)
 Rencontres Internationales, Kulturhaus, Berlin (Deutchsland) (2012)
 La cuestión del paradigma, Centro de Arte La Panera, Lleida (2011)
 Norma Jeane es Marilyn, Museo de Bellas Artes, Santander (2011)
 Dune, Espacio Menosuno, Festival Proyector Video Arte, Madrid (2011)
 9 Edición Proyecto Circo, Bienal de La Habana (Cuba) (2010)
 Vivimos del aire, Galeria Del Sol St., Santander (2010)
 Fifteen, Edge Zones, Miami (USA) (2009)
 Vivimos del aire, Escuela de Arte Pedro Almodóvar, Ciudad Real (2009)
 Virtual Box, Galería Metropolitana, Feria Video Loop, Barcelona (2008)
 Dordrecht, El Observatorio del Arte, Foco Norte, Santander (2008)
 Noches de Videoarte, Espacio Escala, Caja Sol, Sevilla (2007)
 Korea Art Fair, KIAF, Galeria Metropolitana de Barcelona (Korea) (2007)
 Festival de Photo et Video de Biarritz. Biarritz (France) (2006)
 LOOP 06, Stand Galeria Metropolitana Barcelona. Barcelona (2006)
 El Cuarto Oscuro, My Name´s Lolita Art Gallery, Madrid (2006)
 Kornhausforum - Hangar. Bern (Suitzerland) (2005) 
 Sala Tecla, Salón de jóvenes creadores de Europa. Barcelona (2005)
 49 Salon Européen des jeunes createurs Montrouge. Paris (France) (2005)
 Ars Sublimis, Orensanz Museum, New York (USA) (2004)
 Shortinvenice, Bienal de Venecia. Venezia (Italy) (2004)
 Galería Pablo Hojas, Kitsch & Chic. Santander (2004)
 Museo do Mar de Vigo, "Olladas oceánicas". Vigo (2003)
 Saatchi & Saatchi, PHotoEspaña VI. Madrid (2003)
 Centre Cívic Sant Andreu, Cuando me acerco... Barcelona (2003)
 Laboratorio de arte Pandemolden, Back to Berlin. Santander (2003)
 Universidad de Cantabria, Luis Bezeta. Santander (2002)
 Festival de Cine de Medina del Campo, Spain (2002)
 Festival Internacional Cinema Fantástico de Sitges, Spain (2002)
 Centro Cultural Doctor Madrazo, Santander (2001)

Collections
His works are part of important public and private collections, among which include the Museum of Modern and Contemporary Art of Santander and Cantabria, the CajaSol Foundation and the Valencian Institute of Modern Art, IVAM.

Honours and awards
 2019 Plataforma Audiovisual. Area de Cultura de la Diputación de Barcelona (Spain)
 2017 Finalist Grand IndieWise Convention, Miami (EEUU)
 2016 Nominated for Blooom Award by Warsteiner, Cologne (Germany)
 2014 BCN Producció, La Capella, Barcelona
 2014 Premios Anuaria 'Mejor cubierta de un libro', Premio Nacional Diseño
 2013 Grant production audiovisual, Gobierno de Cantabria
 2012 First Prize Video Art and Performance, 6 Premio Arte Laguna, Venecia (Italy)
 2012 Grant Prize of Artes Plásticas, Gobierno de Cantabria
 2011 Prize videocreation Madatac, Metrópolis, TVE
 2009 First prize Video Creation EiTB, Bilbao Arte, Bilbao
 2006 Art Grant, IUA-Phonos, Barcelona
 2005 Residence Artist Grant, Hangar. Barcelona
 2004 Grand Prix, 49 Salon Europeen jeunes createurs. Paris (France)
 2003 Prize, II Premio de Artes Plásticas de Cantabria
 2003 First Prize Videocreación Pancho Cossio. Santander
 2003 Special Mention Festival Envideo. Cáceres
 2002 First Prize Miquel Casablancas. Barcelona
 2002 First Prize IX Festival de Ciudad Real
 2002 First Prize III Festival Audiovisual de Majadahonda. Madrid
 2002 First Prize Videocreation IX Festival Suel-R. Fuengirola

Publications
 Los Ángeles Todos (Santander, 2012)
 El laberinto del complejo de culpabilidad (Santander, 2014)
 Flechas de rayo (Santander, 2015)
 Estallo sino (Santander, 2016)
 El principio de la cinematicidad (Barcelona, 2017)
 Aliasing EP Astral Copper (Santander, 2016, Demolden Video Project)
 Nyquist Criterion LP Astral Copper (Santander, 2021, Demolden Video Project)

References

External links

 First Prize Video Art and Performance 6 Arte Laguna, Venezia
 Ars Sublimis, Orensanz Museum, New York
 Agencia Española de Cooperación Internacional para el Desarrollo, AECID
 Les Rencontres Internationales, Paris-Berlin
 Al Revés 2, Programa Metrópolis, La 2, Televisión Española
 Cortos Invertidos, Programa Metrópolis, La 2, Televisión Española
 Premios Madatac Metrópolis, La 2, Televisión Española
 Exposición Museo de Arte Moderno y Contemporáneo de Santander y Cantabria
 Colección Museo de Arte Moderno y Contemporáneo de Santander y Cantabria
 Donación Museo de Arte Moderno y Contemporáneo de Santander y Cantabria
 Actividades Museo de Arte Moderno y Contemporáneo de Santander y Cantabria
 Luis Bezeta expone una videocreación en el EspacioMeBAS sobre la verdadera Marilyn Monroe, Norma Jeane, Europa Press
 Mundanalrüido, Gremio de Editores de Cantabria
 Movimiento Pandemolden, Europa Press
 Berlin Remixed, Luis Bezeta
 Paral-lel, Agencia de Publicidad y Discografica Barcelona
 LOOP Barcelona Video Art Festival
 Hangar, Centro de Producción Artística, Barcelona
 La Capella, Ayuntamiento de Barcelona
 Aliasing EP, Astral Copper
 Colección Los Bragales
 Luis Bezeta – MKYC, Beusual Estudio de Diseño
 Premio Miquel Casablancas 2002
 Santander Open Estudio. Visita al estudio de Luis Bezeta
 Loop Barcelona Video Art Fair 2006
 VIDEOCLOOP Loop Barcelona Video Art Fair
 Region 0, New York, Diario El Pais

1976 births
Living people
Humboldt University of Berlin alumni
21st-century Spanish male artists
Spanish cinematographers
20th-century Spanish male artists
People from Santander, Spain
Spanish filmmakers